Fouad Douiri (born 1960 in Fes) is a Moroccan politician of the Istiqlal Party. He was Minister of Energy, Mines, Water and Environment in  Abdelilah Benkirane's cabinet.

Professional life
Before accessing a ministerial portfolio, Douiri held the position of "Président du Directoire" in RMA-Watanya, the insurance division of Othman Benjelloun's financial holding company.
In April 2013, while King Mohammed VI was on vacation in France, Hamid Chabat Secretary-General of the Istiqlal Party announced his intentions to leave the coalition that forms the cabinet of Abdelilah Benkirane. Consequently, a resignation request was submitted on 9 July 2013 for all the Party's ministers.

See also
Cabinet of Morocco

References

External links
Energy department
Water department
Environment department

Living people
Government ministers of Morocco
1960 births
People from Fez, Morocco
Moroccan engineers
Moroccan business executives
Istiqlal Party politicians